Scientist Meets the Roots Radics is an album recorded and released in 1982 by the dub musician Scientist. Recorded at Channel One Studios in Kingston, Jamaica. It was released by Selena, a British record label.

Track listing

Side One 
 "Jah Army"
 "Flabba is Wild"
 "Some Dub"
 "Whip Them"
 "Fighting Radics"

Side Two 
 "Kill The Devil's Wife"
 "Jah is Love"
 "Wa di is Free"
 "Best Dub on Ya"
 "Forward Dis Ya Dub"

Personnel
 Lincoln "Style" Scott – drums
 Carlton "Santa" Davis – drums
 Bingy Bunny – lead guitar
 Noel "Sowell" Bailey – rhythm guitar
 Flabba Holt – bass, arrangements
 Anthony "Steelie" Johnson - keyboards
 Christopher "Sky Juice" Blake – percussion
Technical
 Bunny Tom Tom (Anthony "Crucial Bunny" Graham) - recording
 Scientist - mixing at King Tubby's Studio

Scientist (musician) albums
1982 albums
Dub albums